Methylocella is a genus of bacteria from the family of Beijerinckiaceae.

References

 

Beijerinckiaceae
Bacteria genera